Fire Force is a Japanese manga series written and illustrated by Atsushi Ohkubo. It was serialized in the manga magazine Weekly Shōnen Magazine from September 23, 2015, to February 22, 2022. The individual chapters have been collected by Kodansha into individual tankōbon volumes. The first volume was released on February 17, 2016. Thirty-four volumes have been released . The series is licensed for English language release in North America by Kodansha USA, which has published the first volume on November 8, 2016.


Volumes list

References

Fire Force